Walnut Hill station may refer to:

Walnut Hill station (SEPTA), a SEPTA Regional Rail station in Abington Township, Pennsylvania
Walnut Hill station (DART), a DART Red Line station in Dallas, Texas
Walnut Hill/Denton station, a DART Green line station in Dallas, Texas

See also
Walnut Hill (disambiguation)